William Smith (1 November 1839 – 19 April 1897) was an English first-class cricketer, who played eleven matches for Yorkshire County Cricket Club from 1865 to 1874.

Born in Darlington, County Durham, England, Smith was a right-handed batsman, he scored 260 runs at an average of 16.25, with his best score  of 90 against Lancashire in a Roses Match.  He took eight catches in the field, but did not bowl.

Smith died in April 1897 in South Bank, Middlesbrough, Yorkshire.

References

External links
Cricinfo Profile
Cricket Archive Statistics

1839 births
1897 deaths
Yorkshire cricketers
Sportspeople from Darlington
English cricketers
Cricketers from County Durham